CBD East Transfer Center is a bus-only station bounded by Olive, Live Oak, Pearl and Pacific, near Pearl Station in Dallas, Texas (USA). It is one of two Downtown Dallas transfer centers owned by DART in the Central Business District.

Unlike many transit centers, CBD East Transfer Center does not provide parking, however it does provide an air conditioned/heating facility daily.

A light rail subway station is planned to be constructed at the transfer hub as part of the D2 Subway project.

See also
CBD West Transfer Center

References

External links 
Dallas Area Rapid Transit 
CBD East Transfer Center

Dallas Area Rapid Transit
Bus stations in Dallas
1990s establishments in Texas
Proposed railway stations in the United States